The Taker/Tulsa is an album by American country music artist Waylon Jennings, released in 1971 on RCA Nashville. The LP rose to #12 on the Billboard country albums chart while the single "The Taker" was a Top 5 hit single.

Background
The Taker/Tulsa is notable for featuring four compositions by Kris Kristofferson, who had emerged as a beacon for songwriters who wanted to bring a new poetic realism to country music.  Jennings, who had bristled when RCA producers told him what songs to record, began demanding more control over his records on all fronts, and began recording songs by newer songwriters like Kristofferson, Shel Silverstein, and Mickey Newbury.  Jennings was particularly taken with the Kristofferson ballad "Lovin' Her Was Easier (Than Anything I'll Ever Do Again)" but was stymied by RCA's recording policies, recalling in the audio version of his autobiography Waylon:

"I went to Los Angeles and cut Kris Kristofferson's "Lovin' Her Was Easier" with Ricky Nelson's band.  At the time he had a good bunch of guys with him, including Sonny Curtis.  It was a great record, up-tempo with a good guitar riff.  They [RCA] wouldn't release it because it was recorded in L.A.  They didn't want to set a precedent...They didn't know who I was or what I was about, and I tried my best to keep 'em in the dark."

Although Jennings continued working with RCA producers like Danny Davis, his records began sounding less and less like his early work with the label.  In his book Outlaws: Waylon, Willie, Kris, and the Renegades of Nashville, author Michael Striessguth writes, "Most important, Waylon appeared to have found his voice.  Whether Davis had anything to do with that or not, the Davis-produced tracks showcase deeply riveting vocals amid bold instrumentation on starkly realistic songs, many of which appeared on The Taker/Tulsa..."

Track listing
 "The Taker" (Kris Kristofferson, Shel Silverstein) – 2:29
 "You'll Look for Me" (Waylon Jennings) – 2:03
 "Mississippi Woman" (Red Lane) – 2:56
 "Lovin' Her Was Easier (Than Anything I'll Ever Do Again)" (Kristofferson) – 3:06
 "Six White Horses" (Bobby Bond) – 2:42
 "(Don't Let the Sun Set on You) Tulsa" (Wayne Carson Thompson) – 3:08
 "Casey's Last Ride" (Kristofferson) – 4:01
 "A Legend in My Time" (Don Gibson) – 2:21
 "Sunday Morning Comin' Down" (Kristofferson) – 3:54
 "Grey Eyes You Know" (Harlan Howard, Gene Myers) – 2:34

References

1971 albums
Waylon Jennings albums
RCA Records albums